Pierre Rameau (1674 – 26 January 1748), was the French dancing master to Elisabetta Farnese, and the author of two books that now provide us with valuable information about Baroque dance.

Rameau's first book, Le Maître à Danser (1725, Paris), was a dance manual giving instruction on formal ballroom dancing in the French style.  The first part covers posture, reverences, steps, and the ballroom minuet, while the second part is concerned entirely with the use of the arms.  His second book, Abbregé de la Nouvelle Methode (c1725, Paris), described a modified version of Beauchamp–Feuillet notation and included several choreographies by Pécour in the new notation.  While Rameau's notation was not generally adopted, his information about the shortcomings of Beauchamp–Feuillet notation provides dance historians with clarifications about the execution of the steps.

See also
 List of dancers

External links 
 
Library of Congress An American Ballroom Companion facsimiles of Rameau's works:
 Le Maître à Danser (1748 edition)From the Collections at the Library of Congress
 Abbregé de la Nouvelle Methode From the Collections at the Library of Congress

18th-century French dancers
French didactic writers
French choreographers
Baroque dance
18th-century French writers
18th-century French male writers
1674 births
1748 deaths
French male non-fiction writers
French male dancers